The following is a list of number-one singles on the Billboard Japan Hot 100 chart in 2017. Koi successfully reached Japan's Billboard Year-End Hot 100 singles of 2017, by reaching number-one for 11 non-consecutive weeks.

Chart history

References

2017 in Japanese music
Japan Hot 100
Lists of number-one songs in Japan